Eunus (died 132 BC) was a Roman slave from Apamea in Syria who became the leader of the slave uprising in the First Servile War (135 BC–132 BC) in the Roman province of Sicily. Eunus rose to prominence in the movement through his reputation as a prophet and wonder-worker and ultimately declared himself king. He claimed to receive visions and communications from the goddess Atargatis, a prominent goddess in his homeland whom he identified with the Sicilian Demeter. Some of his prophecies were that the rebel slaves would successfully capture the city of Enna and that he would be a king some day.

Sources
Most of the literary evidence for Eunus and the First Servile War comes from the writings of Diodorus Siculus, who used Posidonius as his primary source. Florus' Epitome, which provides excerpts from lost portions of Livy, is the most detailed account in Latin. Both Diodorus and Posidonius were sympathetic to the Romans. Diodorus lived in Rome, and Cicero asked Posidonius to write an account of the former's consulate. Since Eunus was a defeated enemy of Rome, their accounts of both the slave uprising and its leader were likely biased. Like Eunus, Posidonius was from the Syrian town of Apamea. He likely based his details about Eunus' worship of Atargatis in his personal knowledge of the goddess's mendicant priests.

Biography
Eunus was enslaved to a Greek man of Enna named Antigenes. He was reputed to be an oracle who received visions from the gods when he was both awake and asleep. Eunus was so well regarded for this that Antigenes would introduce him at his guests to divine their fortune. He was also said to blow fire from his mouth when during his oracular trances, which he held as proof of his supernatural powers. However, at least Florus identified it as a fire eating act. According to him, Eunus hid a small, perforated nutshell containing burning material on his mouth, which he would blow through in order to emit fire and sparks.

After the First Servile War started, Eunus placed himself in a leading role, claiming their revolt was backed by the gods. He participated in the storming of Enna, where Diodorus describes him standing in the front ranks of the assault, blowing fire from his mouth. Upon the capture of the city, Eunus crowned himself king and subsequently took the name Antiochus, a name used by the Seleucids who ruled his homeland Syria, and he called his followers, who numbered in the tens of thousands, Syrians. Eunus seems to have attempted to build a state independent of Rome, minting his own coins and evolving a command and supply structure capable of sustaining his forces in the field for long periods. A small bronze coin, minted at Enna, bears the inscription "King Antiochus", this being likely Eunus. His armies took several other cities in central and eastern Sicily.

He was successful in defeating Roman forces sent against him for several years. However, after his army was defeated by a Roman army under the leadership of M. Perperna, Eunus, with members of his court, took refuge in a cavern, where he was subsequently captured. He was sent to prison, where he died of illness before he could be punished.

References

Bibliography

External links 
 Livius.org: Eunus 

Rebel slaves in ancient Rome
2nd-century BC Romans
Prophets
People from Enna
Self-proclaimed monarchy
Year of birth unknown
132 BC deaths
Apamea, Syria